The Linjiang Yalu River Bridge is a bridge over the Yalu River, connecting Linjiang City, Jilin Province, China, with Chunggang County, Chagang Province, North Korea. It was built by the Japanese in 1938 and Linjiang Border Post is located there. A little downstream from the bridge is Yunfeng Dam.

During the Korean War, it was one of the border posts from which the Chinese People's Volunteer Army entered North Korea.

See also
 Sino–Korean Friendship Bridge and New Yalu River Bridge (Dandong)
 Ji'an Yalu River Border Railway Bridge
 Changbai-Hyesan International Bridge
 Tumen Border Bridge (Tumen City)
 Tumen River Bridge (Hunchun)

References

International bridges
Bridges in China
Bridges in North Korea
China–North Korea border crossings
Buildings and structures in Chagang Province
Buildings and structures in Jilin
Transport in Jilin
Baishan
Manchukuo
Bridges completed in 1938
1938 establishments in China
Yalu River
1938 establishments in Korea